St. Pauls House is a historic building situated in Leeds, West Yorkshire, England. It was built in 1878 as a warehouse and cloth cutting works for Sir John Barran, 1st Baronet.

History
St. Pauls House was built in 1878 in Park Square, Leeds as a warehouse and cloth cutting works for Sir John Barran, 1st Baronet. The building was designed by Thomas Ambler in an ornate Hispano-Moorish style.

It is a Grade II* listed building. The building was extensively altered and restored in 1976 with a wholly new interior. The minarets, originally terracotta, are now fibreglass reproductions.

DAC Beachcroft LLP (and DAC Beachcroft Claims Ltd) have used the property since May 2015.

Gallery

See also
 Architecture of Leeds
 Grade II* listed buildings in Leeds
 Listed buildings in Leeds (City and Hunslet Ward - northern area)

References

Grade II* listed buildings in West Yorkshire
Listed buildings in Leeds
Thomas Ambler buildings